In the mathematical field of graph theory, the Frucht graph is a cubic graph with 12 vertices, 18 edges, and no nontrivial symmetries. It was first described by Robert Frucht in 1939.

The Frucht graph is a pancyclic, Halin graph with chromatic number 3, chromatic index 3, radius 3, and diameter 4. Like every Halin graph, the Frucht graph is polyhedral (planar and 3-vertex-connected) and  Hamiltonian, with girth 3. Its independence number is 5.

The Frucht graph can be constructed from the LCF notation: .

Algebraic properties
The Frucht graph is one of the five smallest cubic graphs possessing only a single graph automorphism, the identity (that is, every vertex can be distinguished topologically from every other vertex). Such graphs are called asymmetric (or identity) graphs. Frucht's theorem states that any group can be realized as the group of symmetries of a graph, and a strengthening of this theorem also due to Frucht states that any group can be realized as the symmetries of a 3-regular graph; the Frucht graph provides an example of this realization for the trivial group.

Gallery

See also

References 

Individual graphs
Regular graphs
Planar graphs